Monterey is an unincorporated community and census-designated place (CDP) in Concordia Parish, Louisiana, United States. As of the 2010 census it had a population of 439.

The community is located near the junction of Louisiana Highways 129 and 565 in west central Concordia Parish, southwest of Ferriday. It is also part of the Natchez, MS–LA Micropolitan Statistical Area.

Monterey has a post office with the ZIP code 71354. Public education in the community is provided by Concordia Parish Schools

Demographics

Notable people

Ross Ellis (1992- ), country artist and musician

References

Census-designated places in Concordia Parish, Louisiana
Census-designated places in Louisiana
Census-designated places in Natchez micropolitan area